Butyric anhydride or butanoic anhydride is the chemical compound with the formula (CH3CH2CH2CO)2O.  The molecule can be described as a condensation of two molecules of butyric acid with elimination of one water molecule (hence its name).

Butyric anhydride is a clear colorless liquid that smells strongly of butyric acid, which is formed by its reaction to moisture in the air.

Safety
Butyric anhydride is a combustible, corrosive liquid.  It is considered water sensitive.

References

Carboxylic anhydrides
Foul-smelling chemicals